Persatuan Sepakbola Ayi Sinaga Babah Buloh (simply known as PSAS Babah Buloh) is an Indonesian football club based in North Aceh Regency, Aceh. They currently compete in the Liga 3.

References

External links
PSAS Babah Buloh Instagram

 North Aceh Regency
Football clubs in Indonesia
 Football clubs in Aceh
Association football clubs established in 2019
2019 establishments in Indonesia